Mianserin, sold under the brand name Tolvon among others, is an atypical antidepressant that is used primarily in the treatment of depression in Europe and elsewhere in the world. It is a tetracyclic antidepressant (TeCA). Mianserin is closely related to mirtazapine, both chemically and in terms of its actions and effects, although there are significant differences between the two drugs.

Medical uses
Mianserin at higher doses (30–90mg/day) is used for the treatment of major depressive disorder.

It can also be used at lower doses (around 10mg/day) to treat insomnia.

Contraindications
It should not be given, except if based on clinical need and under strict medical supervision, to people younger than 18 years old, as it can increase the risk of suicide attempts and suicidal thinking, and it can increase aggressiveness.

While there is no evidence that it can harm a fetus from animal models, there are no data showing it safe for pregnant women to take.

People with severe liver disease should not take mianserin, and it should be used with caution for people with epilepsy or who are at risk for seizures, as it can lower the threshold for seizures. If based on clinical decision, normal precautions should be exercised and the dosages of mianserin and any concurrent therapy kept under review and adjusted as needed.

Side effects
Very common (incidence > 10%) adverse effects include constipation, dry mouth, and drowsiness at the beginning of treatment.

Common (1% < incidence ≤ 10%) adverse effects include drowsiness during maintenance therapy, tremor, headache, dizziness, vertigo, and weakness.

Uncommon (0.1% < incidence ≤ 1%) adverse effects include weight gain.

Withdrawal
Abrupt or rapid discontinuation of mianserin may provoke a withdrawal, the effects of which may include depression, anxiety, panic attacks, decreased appetite or anorexia, insomnia, diarrhea, nausea and vomiting, and flu-like symptoms, such as allergies or pruritus, among others.

Overdose
Overdose of mianserin is known to produce sedation, coma, hypotension or hypertension, tachycardia, and QT interval prolongation.

Interactions 

Mianserin may enhance the sedative effects of drugs such as alcohol, anxiolytics, hypnotics, or antipsychotics when co-administered. It may decrease the efficacy of antiepileptic medications.

Carbamazepine and phenobarbital will cause the body to metabolize mianserin faster and may reduce its effects.  There is a risk of dangerously low blood pressure if people take mianserin along with diazoxide, hydralazine, or nitroprusside.   Mianserin can make antihistamines and antimuscarinics have stronger effects. Mianserin should not be taken with apraclonidine, brimonidine, sibutramine, or the combination drug of artemether with lumefantrine.

Pharmacology

Pharmacodynamics

Mianserin appears to exert its effects via antagonism of histamine and serotonin receptors, and inhibition of norepinephrine reuptake. More specifically, it is an antagonist/inverse agonist at most or all sites of the histamine H1 receptor, serotonin 5-HT1D, 5-HT1F, 5-HT2A, 5-HT2B, 5-HT2C, 5-HT3, 5-HT6, and 5-HT7 receptors, and adrenergic α1- and α2-adrenergic receptors, and additionally a norepinephrine reuptake inhibitor. As an H1 receptor inverse agonist with high affinity, mianserin has strong antihistamine effects (e.g., sedation). Conversely, it has low affinity for the muscarinic acetylcholine receptors, and hence lacks anticholinergic properties. Mianserin has been found to be a low affinity but potentially significant partial agonist of the κ-opioid receptor (Ki = 1.7 μM; EC50 = 0.53 μM), similarly to some tricyclic antidepressants (TCAs).

Blockade of the H1 and possibly α1-adrenergic receptors has sedative effects, and also antagonism of the 5-HT2A and α1-adrenergic receptors inhibits activation of intracellular phospholipase C (PLC), which seems to be a common target for several different classes of antidepressants. By antagonizing the somatodendritic and presynaptic α2-adrenergic receptors, which function predominantly as inhibitory autoreceptors and heteroreceptors, mianserin disinhibits the release of norepinephrine, dopamine, serotonin, and acetylcholine in various areas of the brain and body.

Along with mirtazapine, although to a lesser extent in comparison, mianserin has sometimes been described as a noradrenergic and specific serotonergic antidepressant (NaSSA). However, the actual evidence in support of this label has been regarded as poor.

Pharmacokinetics
The bioavailability of mianserin is 20 to 30%. Its plasma protein binding is 95%. Mianserin is metabolized in the liver by the CYP2D6 enzyme via N-oxidation and N-demethylation. Its elimination half-life is 21 to 61 hours. The drug is excreted 4 to 7% in the urine and 14 to 28% in feces.

Chemistry

Mianserin is a tetracyclic piperazinoazepine; mirtazapine was developed by the same team of organic chemists and differs via addition of a nitrogen atom in one of the rings. (S)-(+)-Mianserin is approximately 200–300 times more active than its enantiomer (R)-(−)-mianserin; hence, the activity of mianserin lies in the (S)-(+) isomer.

History
It was developed but not discovered by Organon International; the first patents were issued in The Netherlands in 1967, and it was launched in France in 1979 under the brand name Athymil, and soon thereafter in the UK as Norval. Investigators conducting clinical trials in the US submitted fraudulent data, and it was never approved in the US.

Mianserin was one of the first antidepressants to reach the UK market that was less dangerous than the tricyclic antidepressants in overdose; as of 2012 it was not prescribed much in the UK.
OXYCODON KOPEN

Society and culture

Generic names
Its generic name in French and its  are miansérine, in Spanish and Italian and its  are mianserina, and in Latin is mianserinum.

Brand names
Mianserin is marketed in many countries mainly under the brand name Tolvon. It is also available throughout the world under a variety of other brand names including Athymil, Bonserin, Bolvidon, Deprevon, Lantanon, Lerivon, Lumin, Miansan, Serelan, Tetramide, and Tolvin among others.

Availability
Mianserin is not approved for use in the United States, but is available in the United Kingdom and other European countries.  A mianserin generic drug received  approval in May 1996 and is available in Australia.

Research
The use of mianserin to help people with schizophrenia who are being treated with antipsychotics has been studied in clinical trials; the outcome is unclear.

References

Further reading 

 

5-HT1F antagonists
Alpha-1 blockers
Alpha-2 blockers
H1 receptor antagonists
Kappa-opioid receptor agonists
Schering-Plough brands
Merck & Co. brands
Noradrenergic and specific serotonergic antidepressants
Norepinephrine reuptake inhibitors
Phenylpiperazines
Serotonin receptor antagonists
Tertiary amines
Tetracyclic antidepressants